Hinterland  is a German word meaning "the land behind".

Hinterland or Hinterlands may also refer to:

Film and television
Hinterland (1998 film), a film by Jacques Nolot
Hinterland (2015 film), a British film
Hinterland (2021 film), a German-language film directed by Stefan Ruzowitzky
Hinterland (TV series), a BBC TV police drama series set in Wales
Hinterland Who's Who, a series of 60-second public service announcements profiling Canadian animals

Music
Hinterland (band), a Canadian band, active 2002-2008
Hinterland, an Irish two-man band, active 1989-1992; see 
Hinterland (Aim album), 2002, or the title song
Hinterland, a 2006 album by Canadian singer-songwriter Old Man Luedecke 
Hinterland, a 2008 album by Belgian band Mint 
Hinterland, a 2013 album by German rapper Casper 
Hinterland (Lonelady album), 2015

Other uses
"Hinterlands" (short story), a 1981 science fiction short story by William Gibson
Hinterland (video game), a 2008 high fantasy role-playing video game by Tilted Mill
Hinterland, Switzerland, a district of the Canton of Appenzell Ausserrhoden, Switzerland
Hinterland Music Festival, St. Charles, Iowa
Hinterland , a 2012 novel by Caroline Brothers
Hinterland Studios, a Canadian game studio known for The Long Dark
Godslayer Book Two: Hinterland, a 2006 novel by James Rollins